Charissa variegata, the etched taupe, is a moth of the family Geometridae. It was described by Philogène Auguste Joseph Duponchel in 1830. It is found in France, the Iberian Peninsula, Switzerland, Austria, Italy, the Balkan Peninsula and Ukraine.

The wingspan is 20–30 mm.

The larvae feed on Carex, Thymus, Sedum and Chamaecytisus species.

Subspecies

Charissa variegata variegata
Charissa cava (Vojnits, 1968)
Charissa rothschildi (Prout, 1929)

References

External links

Charissa variegata in Lepidoptera catalog
Lepiforum.de

Moths described in 1830
Gnophini
Moths of Europe
Taxa named by Philogène Auguste Joseph Duponchel